Hurt Me is a 1983 acoustic guitar album by Johnny Thunders.

Track listing

Side A
All tracks composed by Johnny Thunders; except where indicated

"Sad Vacation"
"Eve of Destruction" (P.F. Sloan)
"Too Much Too Soon" (Thunders, Sylvain Sylvain)
"Joey Joey" (Bob Dylan)
"I'm a Boy I'm a Girl"
"Go Back to Go" (Thunders, Sylvain Sylvain)
"I Like to Play Games"
"Hurt Me" (Thunders, Richard Hell)
"Illegitimate Son of Segovia"
"It Ain't Me Babe" (Bob Dylan)

Side B
"Diary of a Lover"
"I'd Rather Be With the Boys (Than Girls Like You)" (Keith Richards, Andrew Loog Oldham)
"You Can't Put Your Arms Around a Memory"
"She's So Untouchable"
"Ask Me No Questions"
"She's So Strange"
"Lonely Planet Boy" (David Johansen)
"M.I.A."
"Cosa Nostra"

Personnel
Johnny Thunders - guitar, vocals
Charlotte - backing vocals on "I'd Rather Be With the Boys"
Technical
Patrick Woindrich - engineer
Kathy Findlay - cover photography

References

Johnny Thunders albums
1983 albums